Rundell may refer to:

People
 Ada Sophia Rundell (1876-1936), Australian physiotherapist
 Jock Rundell (1895–1973), Scottish footballer (Motherwell goalkeeper) 
 Joel Rundell (1965–-1990), American musician
 Katherine Rundell (born 1987), English author
 Maria Rundell (1745–1828), British cookbook author
 Philip Rundell (1746–1827), English jeweller
 Walter Rundell Jr., American author and historian
 William Rundell (1848–1936), Australian philatelist
 Rundell Winchester (born 1993), Trinidadian footballer

Other uses
 Rundell and Bridge, London jewellery company

See also
 Randall (disambiguation)
 Rundle (disambiguation)